Ali in Wonderland is a 1981 Algerian drama film directed by Ahmed Rachedi. It was entered into the 12th Moscow International Film Festival where it won a Special Prize.

Cast
 Donato Bastos
 Djéloul Beghoura as Ali (as Djelloul Beghoura)
 Corinne Brodbeck as Thérèse
 Albert Delpy as Jean-Christophe
 Saïd Helmi as Salah
 Henri Poirier
 Ahmed Snoussi as Ahmed
 Andrée Tainsy
 Jean Valmont

References

External links
 

1981 films
1981 drama films
1980s French-language films
Algerian drama films